Pârvulescu or Pîrvulescu, a Romanian-language surname, may refer to:
 Constantin Pîrvulescu, communist politician and dissident
 Cristian Pârvulescu, political analyst
 Dumitru Pîrvulescu, Greco-Roman wrestler
 Ioana Pârvulescu, writer
 Nicolae Pârvulescu, mayor of Bucharest
 Paul Pârvulescu, footballer

See also 
 Pârvuleşti (disambiguation)
 Pârvu

Romanian-language surnames